The first three leaders of the Liberal Party of Canada were not chosen at a leadership convention. Alexander Mackenzie (March 1873 – April 1880) and Edward Blake (May 1880 – June 1887) were chosen by the party caucus. Wilfrid Laurier (June 1887 – February 1919) was also chosen by caucus members with the party convention of 1893 ratifying his leadership. The most recent leadership election was held in 2013.

The first Liberal leadership convention was held on August 7, 1919. Balloting continued until one candidate won a majority of votes. After the 1919 convention, a system was adopted where the candidate with the fewest votes on a given ballot is automatically dropped. More recently, any candidate with less than 5% of the vote on the first ballot is also automatically dropped. Since 1919, time has also been given between ballots for candidates to announce if they wish to withdraw and throw their support to another candidate.

The 2009 Liberal leadership election was the last one in which the leader was chosen by delegates. Future leadership elections were to be conducted according to a weighted one member, one vote system in which all party members could cast ballots but in which they would be counted so that each riding had equal weight. This system, however, has been modified in the 2012 Biennial Convention in Ottawa. In addition to the card-carrying membership, registered supporters, a newly created category of Liberal sympathisers, given the right to vote in their constituency.

1919 leadership convention results

The 1919 leadership convention was held in Ottawa, Ontario on August 7, 1919.

Graham withdrew while voting for the third ballot was underway. McKenzie withdrew while voting for the fourth ballot was in process. Votes were not counted for either one, and the convention proceeded directly to the fifth ballot.

1948 leadership convention results

The 1948 leadership convention was held in Ottawa on August 7, 1948.

1958 leadership convention results

The 1958 leadership convention was held in Ottawa on January 16, 1958.

1968 leadership convention results

The 1968 leadership convention was held in Ottawa Civic Centre in Ottawa, Ontario on April 6, 1968.

 MacEachen announced after the first ballot that he was withdrawing and would support Trudeau, but he missed the deadline to remove his name from the ballot.

1980 leadership convention

A leadership convention was scheduled for late March 1980, in Winnipeg, Manitoba but was cancelled due to the fall of the Progressive Conservative government on December 13, 1979 and the calling of the February 18, 1980 federal election. As a result of the snap election call, the Liberal caucus and party executive persuaded Pierre Trudeau to rescind his resignation as party leader and lead the Liberals into the election.

1984 leadership convention results

The 1984 leadership convention was held in Ottawa on June 16, 1984.

1990 leadership convention results

The 1990 leadership convention was held in Calgary, Alberta on June 23, 1990.

2003 leadership convention results

The 2003 leadership convention was held in Toronto, Ontario on November 14, 2003.

Source: Parliament of Canada website

2006 leadership convention results

The 2006 leadership convention was held at the Palais des congrès de Montréal in Montreal, Quebec on December 2–3, 2006.

 = Eliminated from next round
 = Withdrew nomination
 = Winner

2009 leadership convention results

The 2009 leadership convention was held at the Vancouver Convention Centre in Vancouver, British Columbia from April 30-May 3, 2009.

Due to the selection of Michael Ignatieff as interim leader as a result of the 2008–2009 Canadian parliamentary dispute and an agreement by other candidates to withdraw in favour of Ignatieff, the 2009 convention served to ratify Ignatieff's leadership and was not a contested leadership vote. Bob Rae and Dominic LeBlanc withdrew in December 2008 (five months prior to the convention) allowing Ignatieff to become leader by default.

2013 leadership election

The leadership election was held on April 14, 2013.

References 

 
Lists of elections in Canada